A pipe band is a musical ensemble consisting of pipers and drummers. There are many such bands in the world, which play for ceremonial purposes, recreation, competition or all three. This list encompasses only notable pipe bands with their own Wikipedia page.

North America Pipe Band Associations
British Columbia Pipers Association (BCPA), Pipe Band Association for British Columbia, Washington, and Oregon. Home of the 2008 World Champion Simon Fraser University Pipe Band.
Eastern United States Pipe Band Association (EUSPBA), the Eastern US equivalent of the RSPBA.
Midwest Pipe Band Association (MWPBA), pipe band association encompassing the Midwest region.
Western United States Pipe Band Association (WUSPBA), the pipe band association of the West Coast.

European Pipe Band Associations

Belgium

France

Northern Ireland

Republic of Ireland

Scotland

For a list of British Army regimental pipe bands see Army School of Bagpipe Music and Highland Drumming

Notable former bands

Americas

Canada

United States

Australasia

Australia

Australian pipe bands are generally registered with Pipe Bands Australia.

New Zealand

New Zealand pipe bands are generally registered with Royal New Zealand Pipe Bands' Association.

References

External links

 RSPBA homepage
 IPBA homepage
 World Map of Pipe Bands

 
Pipe bands
Pipe bands
Pipe bands